The women's 100 metres at the 2004 Summer Olympics as part of the athletics program were held at the Athens Olympic Stadium from August 20 to 21.

In the first round, the first three runners from each of the eight heats, together with the eight next fastest overall runners (8×3+8=32), automatically qualified for the second round. In the second round, these thirty-two runners competed in four heats, with the first three from each heat and the four next fastest overall (4×3+4=16) advancing to the semifinals. In the semifinals, only the first four runners from each of the two heats move on to the final (2×4=8).

With some of the world's most promising sprinters, including 2000 Olympic champion Marion Jones and home favorite Ekaterini Thanou, absent, the race had become widely open in the final. The start was notably uneven as Bulgaria's Ivet Lalova and Jamaica's Sherone Simpson jumped into upright running positions quickly from the blocks, while Simpson's Jamaican teammates Aleen Bailey and Veronica Campbell and American favorite Lauryn Williams got out behind. Campbell further seemed to stumble while Williams powerfully overstride from last into the lead in the middle of the track by the halfway mark.  Simpson faded quickly from her fast start being overtaken by Belarusian sprinter Yulia Nestsiarenka, who attempted to find her stride with just 30 metres into the race on the outside. While Williams and Campbell found their stride to maintain a commanding lead towards the 60-metre mark, Nestsiarenka held off a late charge to continue her march past the field and produce a storming finish with a Belarusian record of 10.93 seconds, making her the nation's first Olympic champion in this event. Following an unexpected victory from Nestsiarenka, Williams edged the fast closing Campbell for a silver medal by a hundredth of a second, finishing at 10.96.

Records
, the existing World and Olympic records were as follows.

No new records were set during the competition.

Qualification
The qualification period for Athletics was 1 January 2003 to 9 August 2004. For the women's 200 metres, each National Olympic Committee was permitted to enter up to three athletes that had run the race in 11.30 seconds or faster during the qualification period. If an NOC had no athletes that qualified under that standard, one athlete that had run the race in 11.40 seconds or faster could be entered.

Schedule
All times are Eastern European Summer Time (UTC+3)

Results

Round 1
Qualification rule: The first three finishers in each heat (Q) plus the next eight fastest overall runners (q) qualified for the next round.

Heat 1
Wind: +0.5 m/s

Heat 2
Wind: +0.9 m/s

Heat 3
Wind: −0.7 m/s

Heat 4
Wind: −0.1 m/s

Heat 5
Wind: −0.8 m/s

Heat 6
Wind: −0.3 m/s

Heat 7
Wind: 0.0 m/s

Heat 8
Wind: −0.3 m/s

Quarterfinals
Qualification rule: The first three finishers in each heat (Q) plus the next four fastest overall runners (q) advance to the semifinals.

Quarterfinal 1
Wind: +0.2 m/s

Quarterfinal 2
Wind: 0.0 m/s

Quarterfinal 3
Wind: −0.1 m/s

Quarterfinal 4
Wind: +0.3 m/s

Semifinals
Qualification rule: The first four runners in each semifinal heat (Q) moves on to the final.

Semifinal 1
Wind: +0.1 m/s

Semifinal 2
Wind: −0.1 m/s

Final
Wind: −0.1 m/s

References

External links
 IAAF Athens 2004 Olympic Coverage

W
100 metres at the Olympics
2004 in women's athletics
Women's events at the 2004 Summer Olympics